Scouting was introduced to the Maldives in 1956, according to the National Centre for Linguistic and Historical Research. Initially, this Scouting wasn't carried out as a structured organization and very little is known about the history of Scouting of that period. Along with the introduction of English medium education in Male’, various co-curricular activities also had its beginning.

In May 1961 the First Male’ Scout Group was formed in Majeediyya School. The Group began with Cub Scouting and later in the same year the junior Scout section began. In 1963, the Scout Group was registered at The Boy Scouts Association Imperial Headquarters by its Commonwealth commissioner, Charles Dymoke Green Jr. In this period, the chief commissioner of Maldives was the late Mr. Ahmed Zaki.

On 20 January 1984, the association was registered as the "Maldives Boy Scout Association". It became a member of the World Organization of the Scout Movement (WOSM) on 23 July 1990. It changed its name to "The Scout Association of Maldives" on 14 January 1994.

Leadership 
The president of the Republic of Maldives, Ibrahim Mohamed Solih, is the current Chief Scout of Maldives. The association's National Scout Council has twelve members, including its president elected by the National Scout Assembly to govern the association on behalf of the assembly. No more information on the membership and election of the National Scout Assembly is available. An executive committee, led by the Chief Commissioner is appointed by the council to manage day-to-day affairs of the association.

References

World Organization of the Scout Movement member organizations
Scouting and Guiding in the Maldives
Youth organizations established in 1963